In the Aisles is a 2018 German drama film, directed by Thomas Stuber, that looks at the lives of people filling shelves in an out-of-town supermarket. It was selected to compete for the Golden Bear in the main competition section at the 68th Berlin International Film Festival. At Berlin it won the Prize of the Ecumenical Jury award.

Plot
In a huge new supermarket in the eastern provinces, a withdrawn young man called Christian is hired to help stock the drinks aisle. He works under the equally taciturn Bruno, who gruffly teaches him the job. He also catches the eye of the young blonde Marion, who looks after the confectionery aisle and considers herself a queen bee.

Christian falls for her, but lacks the skill to press his case. Other employees warn him that she is married unhappily to a husband who beats her. One morning he waits outside her house until her husband has gone to work and creeps in with a bunch of flowers. She is in her bath singing but, when she hears him coming up the stairs, he flees.

It emerges that his low self-esteem comes from teenage years in a gang, followed by prison. Bruno's unhappiness results from his loss of status at reunification, when all he could get was this low-grade job, and he hangs himself. Marion's malaise is not explained, but she continues to flirt with Christian.

Cast
 Franz Rogowski as Christian
 Sandra Hüller as Marion
 Peter Kurth as Bruno
 Henning Peker as Wolfgang
 Ramona Kunze-Libnow as Irina
 Andreas Leupold as Rudi
 Sascha Nathan as Johnny
 Michael Specht as Paletten-Klaus
 Matthias Brenner as Jürgen

Reception
The site's critical consensus reads, "A gently beguiling workplace romance with real heart, In the Aisles elevates its relatable story with a pair of outstanding lead performances."

References

External links
 

2018 films
2018 drama films
German drama films
2010s German-language films
2010s German films